John Campbell Bowen (October 3, 1872 – January 2, 1957) was a clergyman, insurance broker and long serving politician. He served as an alderman in the City of Edmonton and went on to serve as a member of the Legislative Assembly of Alberta from 1921 to 1926, sitting with the Liberal caucus in opposition. He also briefly led the provincial Liberal party in 1926.

Bowen was appointed as the sixth and longest-serving lieutenant governor of Alberta. He served that post from 1937 to 1950.

Early life
John Campbell Bowen was born in Metcalfe, Ontario, on October 3, 1872. He was the son of Peter Bowen and Margaret Poaps, and grew up in Ottawa.

He took his post-secondary education at Brandon Baptist College, where he earned a degree in theology, and also at McMaster University. After university he moved west to Dauphin, Manitoba, to become the pastor of the Baptist church in that town. He married Edith Oliver on October 25, 1906.

Bowen moved to Edmonton, Alberta, with his family in 1912 to become pastor of Strathcona Baptist Church. He also got into the insurance business.

Bowen joined the Canadian Expeditionary Force in the First World War, serving as a military chaplain. He gained an interest in politics and ran successfully for municipal office in 1919.

Political career

Municipal
Bowen ran for a seat to Edmonton City Council for the first time in the 1919 Edmonton municipal election. He won the fifth-place seat to serve a two-year term on council as an alderman.

Bowen won election to the Alberta Legislature in 1921 and decided not to run for re-election in the municipal election that year. After he failed a re-election bid in the 1926 Alberta general election, he returned to the municipal politics by winning an aldermanic seat in the 1927 Edmonton municipal election held using single transferable vote.

Bowen ran for mayor in the 1928 Edmonton municipal election after serving only one year of his two-year term as alderman. He was defeated by incumbent mayor Ambrose Bury in a close two-way race.

Provincial
Bowen was elected to the Alberta Legislature as a Liberal candidate in the electoral district of Edmonton. He won the second of five seats that was contested by 26 candidates, under the block voting system. In his maiden speech to the legislature, Bowen brought attention to the need for increased government assistance for the unemployed and for adjustment to the taxation system to reduce the financial burdens facing urban centres.

In 1926 Bowen briefly held leadership of the Alberta Liberal Party and also became Leader of the Official Opposition in Alberta. Bowen ran for re-election in 1926 but was not re-elected.

Bowen attempted a political comeback five years later. He ran for the Liberal nomination for a by-election to be held in the Edmonton electoral district on January 9, 1931. Bowen defeated Joseph Clarke for the right to stand as a Liberal candidate on December 19, 1930, at a convention attended by almost 200 delegates with a vote of 98 to 54. He was defeated in the election finishing third place in the field of four candidates, losing to Conservative candidate Frederick Jamieson.

Lieutenant governor
On March 23, 1937, following the sudden death in office of his predecessor, Philip Primrose, Bowen was appointed as the sixth lieutenant governor of Alberta by Governor General the Lord Tweedsmuir, on the advice of Prime Minister Mackenzie King.

One of Bowen's first acts as Lieutenant Governor on May 1, 1937, was an order in council regarding the "resignation or retirement" of William Chant, Minister of Agriculture, after Premier Aberhart requested Chant's resignation to implement a "more aggressive" Department of Agriculture. It was the second occasion in Alberta where a cabinet minister was removed from office by a lieutenant governor, after Charles W. Cross was removed as attorney general by Robert G. Brett in 1918.

A few weeks after taking office, Bowen became involved in a constitutional crisis when he refused to give royal assent to three government bills passed by the governing Social Credit Party, which was accused of exceeding its constitutional powers. Two of the bills would have put the province's banks under the control of the provincial government, while a third, the Accurate News and Information Act, would have forced newspapers to hand over the names and addresses of their sources to the government, and to print government rebuttals to stories the provincial cabinet objected to.

Mindful of the federal government's disallowance of some of the Social Credit Board's earlier legislation, Bowen initially reserved royal assent of the act and its companions until their legality could be tested at the Supreme Court of Canada as Reference Re Alberta Statutes. This was the first use of the power of reservation in Alberta, and was heavily criticized by the government and by some members of the public, who appeared at the door of Government House, threatening the governor and his family.  All three bills were later declared unconstitutional by the Supreme Court of Canada and the Judicial Committee of the Privy Council. In 1938, Bowen threatened to dismiss Aberhart's government, which would have been an extraordinary use of his reserve powers. The Social Credit government remained immensely popular with the Albertans, however, so the threat was not carried out.

In the summer of 1938 Aberhart's government announced the elimination of Bowen's official residence, his government car, and his secretarial staff. Biographers attribute this action to retaliation by Aberhart.  For a time, Bowen defiantly remained in Government House, despite the power, heat, and telephone service being cut off by the government.  Eventually, however, after being forced to sign an order-in-council closing Government House, Bowen moved to a suite at the Hotel Macdonald.  The building, the furniture, and fixtures were subsequently sold, and Bowen was the last lieutenant governor to officially reside at Government House. Bowen would eventually move into a home in Edmonton's Glenora neighbourhood.

In September 1938 Bowen insisted that an order in council regarding the establishment of credit houses and other Cabinet expenditure proposals be amended to remove the authority for unlimited expenditures, and instead have a limit of $200,000.

During World War II, Bowen spent a lot of his time promoting the sale of war bonds and otherwise helping the war effort. Bowen made many visits to military units posted in Alberta and the United States Army posted in Edmonton and Whitehorse during the construction of the Alaska Highway. On July 2, 1943, Bowen hosted Alaska Territory Governor Ernest H. Gruening for a joint Dominion Day and Independence Day celebration in Edmonton.

Despite the friction between him and the government his posting was renewed. Bowen served almost 13 years as lieutenant-governor, resigning in 1950 due to ill health.

Honours
John Bowen received an honorary doctorate of laws from the University of Alberta in 1939. Bowen also received the American Medal of Freedom Silver Palm in 1947 in recognition of his service to American forces stationed in Edmonton. Bowen was invested as a Knight of Grace in the Most Venerable Order of the Hospital of St. John of Jerusalem in 1949.

In 2002, the City of Edmonton named Bowen Wynd, a road, in his honour.

Late life
Bowen died on January 2, 1957, in Edmonton, and was buried in the Edmonton Cemetery.

References

External links
Legislative Assembly of Alberta Members Listing
 Legislative Assembly of Alberta profile

1872 births
1957 deaths
Alberta Liberal Party MLAs
Canadian Expeditionary Force officers
Edmonton city councillors
Leaders of the Alberta Liberal Party
Lieutenant Governors of Alberta
University of Alberta alumni
Recipients of the Medal of Freedom
Knights of Grace of the Order of St John
Canadian military chaplains
World War I chaplains